Henry II Sinclair, Earl of Orkney (c. 1375 – 1420) was the Jarl (Earl) of Orkney, Baron of Roslin and Pantler of Scotland. According to Roland Saint-Clair writing in the late 19th century, Henry Sinclair was also the first of his family to hold the title of Lord Sinclair.

Early life

He was son of Henry I Sinclair, Earl of Orkney, by his wife Jean, daughter of John Halyburton of Dirleton. He married Egida Douglas, daughter of Sir William Douglas of Nithsdale and maternal granddaughter of King Robert II of Scotland. Sir William Douglas was murdered by a group of assassins who had been employed by Lord Clifford and as a result Sinclair inherited through his wife the whole of the Lordship of Nithsdale.

Earl of Orkney

Sinclair was one of those captured following the Battle of Homildon Hill in 1402, but released on ransom. He had succeeded his father, de facto, as Jarl by 1404; there is no record that he was ever officially installed as Jarl, and no certain record that he ever visited his jarldom.

He was one of those who accompanied James Duke of Rothesay on his journey to France aboard the Maryenknyght, which was captured by English pirates off Flamborough Head in 1406. He followed the prince into captivity, but was soon released. Subsequently he was often in England on business connected with the king's imprisonment.

Henry Sinclair died of influenza on 1 February 1420.

Marriage and issue
In about 1407 he married Egidia Douglas, daughter of Sir William Douglas of Nithsdale and maternal granddaughter of King Robert II of Scotland.
William Sinclair, last Jarl of Orkney, and first Earl of Caithness
Beatrix Sinclair, who married James Douglas, 7th Earl of Douglas.

See also

Barony of Roslin
Lord Sinclair
Earl of Caithness
Lord Herdmanston

References

Sources
Fraser, Sir William. The Douglas Book 4 vols, Edinburgh, 1885.

Henry
Henry
Henry
Earls of Orkney
Year of birth uncertain
1422 deaths